Mike Fitzgerald (born May 4, 1941) is a former professional American football player who played defensive back for the Minnesota Vikings, New York Giants, and Atlanta Falcons

References

1941 births
American football safeties
Iowa State Cyclones football players
Minnesota Vikings players
New York Giants players
Atlanta Falcons players
Players of American football from Detroit
Living people